Francis Southwell (died 1581) was auditor of the exchequer under Henry VIII and a Member (MP) of the Parliament of England for St. Albans in 1558. He was the third son of Francis Southwell and Dorothy, daughter and co-heiress of William Tendring.  His elder brothers were Sir Richard Southwell (1502/3–1564) and the lawyer Sir Robert Southwell (c. 1506 – 1559) of Mereworth in Kent. A fourth brother, Anthony, married  Anne Le Strange, daughter of Sir Thomas Le Strange.

Southwell first married Alice, daughter of William Standish. She died childless. On 6 August 1560 he married Barbara, daughter of John Spencer of Rendlesham Suffolk, who was the widow of Richard Catlyn (d. 1556) of Norwich and Honingham, Norfolk.

References

1581 deaths
Year of birth unknown
English MPs 1554
English MPs 1558
Members of the Parliament of England for Hertfordshire